Guérard, and Guerard may refer to:

Localities 
 Guérard, in the Seine-et-Marne department of the Île-de-France region, north-central France
 Beuzeville-la-Guérard, in the Seine-Maritime department of the Haute-Normandie region, northern France
 Bosc-Guérard-Saint-Adrien, in the Seine-Maritime department of the Haute-Normandie region, northern France
 Templeux-le-Guérard, in the Somme department of the Picardie region, northern France
 Bosc-Guérard-Saint-Adrien, a commune in the Seine-Maritime department in the Haute-Normandie region, northern France

People 
 Albert J. Guerard (1914–2000), American academic and writer
 Albert Léon Guérard (1880–1959), French-born American academic, father of Albert J. Guerard
 Benjamin Guerard (1740–1788), American politician from South Carolina
 Benjamin Guérard (historian)  (1797–1854), French historian and librarian
 Daniel Guérard (born 1974), Canadian ice hockey player
 Michel Guérard (born 1933, Vétheuil, Val-d'Oise), French chef
 Guerard des Lauriers (1898–1988), French theologian and bishop
 Robert Guérard (1641–1715), French Benedictine scholar
 Stéphane Guérard (born 1968), Canadian ice hockey player

Von Guerard 
 Eugene von Guerard (1811–1901), Austrian painter, active in Australia 1852–1882
 Theodor von Guérard (1863–1943), German politician
 Von Guerard Glacier, a glacier between Crescent Glacier and Aiken Glacier
 Von Guerard Stream, a glacial meltwater stream

See also 
 Gérard
 Gerard

French-language surnames